Wharfedale is one of the Yorkshire dales.

Wharfedale may also refer to:

 Wharfedale (company), an electronics manufacturer 
 Wharfedale (ward), Bradford, West Yorkshire, England
 Wharfedale Rural District, a former rural district in the West Riding of Yorkshire, England
 Upper Wharfedale School, in North Yorkshire, England

See also
 River Wharfe, Yorkshire, England
 Wharf (disambiguation)